Niederberndorf is a locality in the municipality Schmallenberg in the High Sauerland District in North Rhine-Westphalia, Germany.

The village has 205 inhabitants and lies in the north of the municipality of Schmallenberg at a height of around 341 m. In the village centre the river Arpe flows in the Wenne and the Kreisstraße 35  meets the Kreisstraße 32.  

Niederberndorn  borders on the villages of Arpe, Landenbeckerbruch, Menkhausen, Mailar, Heiminghausen, Berghausen and Oberberndorf. The St. Blaise Chapel in the village center was first mentioned in 1402.

Gallery

References

Villages in North Rhine-Westphalia
Schmallenberg